Rena boettgeri, also known commonly as the Baja California Cape wormsnake and the Cerralvo Island threadsnake, is a species of snake in the family Leptotyphlopidae. The species is endemic to Baja California, Mexico.

Geographic range
The Cerralvo Island threadsnake is found in the Cape Region of Baja California Sur. This species appears to be absent from the higher elevations of the Sierra La Laguna. It is also found on Isla Cerralvo in the Municipality of La Paz.

Etymology
R. boettgeri is named in honor of German herpetologist Oskar Boettger.

Description
R. boettgeri has the following scalation. The rostral is rounded at the back, taking up about 1/3 the width of the head and almost reaching between the eyes. The nasal is completely divided, with the nostril near the rostral. The ocular reaches the edge of the upper lip between two supralabials, the front of which is just as high but narrower than the rear. There are 4 lower lip shields. There are 14 scales around the body. The body diameter is included 75 times in total length, and the tail length 20 times. Dorsally, the body is monochrome red-brown, and ventrally it is a little lighter.

Reproduction
R. boettgeri reproduces via sexual reproduction.

References

Further reading
Adalsteinsson SA, Branch WR, Trape S, Vitt LJ, Hedges SB (2009). "Molecular phylogeny, classification, and biogeography of snakes of the family Leptotyphlopidae (Reptilia, Squamata)". Zootaxa 2244: 1–50. (Rena boettgeri, new combination).
Smith HM, Larsen KR (1974). "The name of the Baja California Cape wormsnake". Great Basin Naturalist 34: 94–96. (Leptotyphlops humilis boettgeri, new combination).
Werner F (1899). "Beschreibungen einiger neuer Schlangen und Batrachier ". Zoologischer Anzeiger 22: 114–117. (Glauconia boettgeri, new species, p. 116). (in German).

Rena (genus)
Reptiles of Mexico
Reptiles of the United States
Reptiles described in 1899